Morgan Knabe (born May 20, 1981) is a former breaststroke swimmer from Canada, who competed for his native country at two consecutive Summer Olympics, starting in 2000 (2000 - Sydney, AUS and 2004 - Athens, GR).  His best Olympic results were a sixth place in the 100-metre breaststroke, and with the men's 4x100-metre medley relay in Sydney, Australia.

Morgan is currently based in Brisbane as the head coach of Lawnton Swim Club.

See also
 List of Commonwealth Games medallists in swimming (men)

References

External links
 Canadian Olympic Committee
 Canoe biography
 2004 Athens
 
 

1981 births
Living people
Canadian male breaststroke swimmers
Medalists at the FINA World Swimming Championships (25 m)
Olympic swimmers of Canada
Swimmers from Calgary
Swimmers at the 1999 Pan American Games
Swimmers at the 2000 Summer Olympics
Swimmers at the 2004 Summer Olympics
Commonwealth Games medallists in swimming
Commonwealth Games silver medallists for Canada
Commonwealth Games bronze medallists for Canada
Pan American Games gold medalists for Canada
Pan American Games silver medalists for Canada
Pan American Games bronze medalists for Canada
Swimmers at the 2002 Commonwealth Games
Pan American Games medalists in swimming
Goodwill Games medalists in swimming
Competitors at the 2001 Goodwill Games
Medalists at the 1999 Pan American Games
Medallists at the 2002 Commonwealth Games